Milan, Italy is an ancient city in northern Italy first settled in about 400 BC by Celtic Insubres. The settlement was conquered by the Romans in 222 BC and renamed it Mediolanum. Diocletian divided the Roman Empire, choosing the eastern half for himself, making Milan the seat of the western half of the empire, from which Maximian ruled, in the late 3rd and early 4th century AD. In 313 AD of Milan, which officially ended the persecution of Christians. In 774 AD, Milan surrendered to Charlemagne and the Franks.

During the Middle Ages, the city's history was the story of the struggle between two political factions: the Guelphs and the Ghibellines. Finally the Visconti family took power (signoria) in Milan. In 1395 Emperor Wenceslas made Milan a duchy, thus raising the dignity of the city's citizens. In the mid-15th century the Ambrosian Republic was established, taking its name from St. Ambrose, a beloved patron saint of the city. The two rival factions worked together to create the Ambrosian Republic in Milan. However, the republic fell apart in 1450 when Milan was conquered by Francesco Sforza of the House of Sforza, which ushered Milan into becoming one of the leading cities of the Italian Renaissance.

From the late 15th century until the mid 16th century, Milan was involved in The Italian Wars, a series of conflicts, along with most of the city-states of Italy, the Papal States, the Republic of Venice and later most of Western Europe. In 1629 The Great Plague of Milan killed about 60,000 people out of a total population of about 130,000, by 1631 when the plague subsided. This event is considered one of the last great outbreaks of what was a pandemic that ravaged Europe for several centuries, beginning with the Black Death.  In 1713-1714 treaties gave sovereignty to Austria over most of Spain's Italian possessions, including Lombardy and its capital, Milan. Napoleon invaded Italy in 1796, and later declared Milan the capital of the Kingdom of Italy. After Napoleon's occupation ended the Congress of Vienna returned Lombardy and Milan to Austrian control in 1815. This is the period when Milan became a center for lyric opera.

The Milanese staged a rebellion against Austrian rule on March 18, 1848. The Kingdom of Sardinia joined the rebels, and a vote was held in Lombardy which voted to unify with Sardinia. The Austrians defeated the Sardinians on 24 July and reasserted their domination over Milan and northern Italy. Just a few years later another insurgency by Italian nationalists succeeded in ousting the Austrians with the help of Sardinia and France in 1859. Following the Battle of Solferino Milan and the rest of Lombardy joined the Kingdom of Sardinia, which soon achieved control of most of Italy. In 1861 the re-unified city-states and kingdoms became the Kingdom of Italy once again.

With the unification of the country Milan became the dominant commercial center of northern Italy. In 1919 Benito Mussolini rallied the Blackshirts for the first time in Milan, and later they began their March on Rome from Milan. During World War II Milan was extensively damaged by Allied bombings. Upon the surrender of Italy in 1943 German forces occupied northern Italy until the end of the war in 1945. Members of the Italian resistance in Milan took control of the city and executed Mussolini, his mistress and other leaders of his Fascist government by hanging in Piazzale Loreto, Milan.

Since the end of World War II, Italy experienced an economic boom. From 1951 until 1967 the population of Milan grew from 1.3 million to 1.7 million. The city was reconstructed, but in the late 1960s and early 1970s, the city suffered from a huge wave of street violence, labor strikes and political terrorism. During the 1980s, Milan became one of the world's fashion capitals.

Antiquity 

Around 400 BC, the Celtic Insubres settled Milan and the surrounding region. In 222 BC, the Romans conquered the settlement, renaming it Mediolanum.

History tells us that Mediolanum (Milan), the Latinized form of Medhelanon, meaning "sanctuary", was founded by the Insubri Celts in 590 B.C. According to Titus Livy's comments, the city was founded around 600 B.C. by Belloveso, chief of the Celtic tribe. Legend has it that Belloveso found a mythological animal known as the scrofa semilanuta (in Italian: "half-woollen boar") which became the ancient emblem of the city of Milan (from semi-lanuta or medio-lanum). Several ancient sources (including Sidonius Apollinaris, Datius, and, more recently, Andrea Alciato) have argued that the scrofa semilanuta is connected to the etymology of the ancient name of Milan, "Mediolanum", and this is still occasionally mentioned in modern sources, although this interpretation has long been dismissed by scholars. Nonetheless, wool production became a key industry in this area, as recorded during the early Middle Ages (see below).

Milan was conquered by the Romans in 222 B.C. due to its strategic position on the northern borders of the Empire. When Diocletian decided to divide the Empire in half choosing the Eastern half for himself, Milan became the residence of Maximian, ruler of the Western Roman Empire. The construction of the second city walls, roughly four and a half kilometers long and unfurling at today's Foro Bonaparte, date back to his reign. After the abdication of Maximian (in 306 A.D.) on the same day in which Diocletian also abdicated, there were series of wars of succession, during which there was a succession of three emperors in just a few short years: first Severus, who prepared the expedition against Maxentius, then Maxentius himself in war against Constantine, and finally Constantine, victor of the war against Maxentius. In 313 A.D. the Emperors Constantine and Licinius issued the Edict of Milan (Edict of Constantine), ending the persecutions against Christians.

The beginning of the 5th century was the start of a tortuous period of barbarian invasions for Milan. After the city was besieged by the Visigoths in 402, the imperial residence was moved to Ravenna. An age of decadence began which worsened when Attila, King of the Huns, sacked and devastated the city in 452 A.D. In 539, the Ostrogoths conquered and destroyed Milan during the Gothic War against Byzantine Emperor Justinian I. In the summer of 569, a Germanic tribe, the Lombards (from which the name of the Italian region Lombardy derives), conquered Milan, overpowering the small Byzantine army left for its defence. Some Roman structures remained in use in Milan under Lombard rule.

Milan surrendered to Charlemagne and the Franks in 774. The aristocracy and majority of the clergy had taken refuge in Genoa. In 774 when Charlemagne took the title of "King of the Lombards" he established his imperial capital of Aachen in what is today Germany. Before then the Germanic kingdoms had frequently conquered each other, but none had adopted the title of King of another people. The Iron Crown of Lombardy (i.e. referring to Charlemagne's kingdom and not to the Italian region) which was worn by Charlemagne, dates from this period. Milan's domination under the Franks led by Charlemagne, did nothing to improve the city's fortune and the city's impoverishment increased and Milan became a county seat.

Middle Ages 

The 11th century saw a reaction against the control of the Holy Roman Emperors. The city-state was born, an expression of the new political power of the city and its will to fight against all feudal powers. Milan was no exception. It did not take long, however, for the city states to begin fighting each other to try to limit neighbouring powers. The Milanese destroyed Lodi and continuously warred with Pavia, Cremona and Como, who in turn asked Frederick I Barbarossa for help. In a sally they captured Empress Beatrice and forced her to ride a donkey backwards out through the city. These brought the destruction of much of Milan in 1162. A fire destroyed the storehouses containing the entire food supply: and within just a few days Milan was forced to surrender.

A period of peace followed and Milan prospered as a centre of trade due to its position. As a result of the independence that the Lombard cities gained in the Peace of Constance in 1183, Milan returned to the commune form of local government first established in the 11th century. In 1208 Rambertino Buvalelli served a term as podestà of the city, in 1242 Luca Grimaldi, and in 1282 Luchetto Gattilusio. The position was a dangerous one: in 1252 Milanese heretics assassinated the Church's Inquisitor, later known as Saint Peter Martyr, at a ford in the nearby contado; the killers bribed their way to freedom, and in the ensuing riot the podestà was almost lynched. In 1256 the archbishop and leading nobles were expelled from the city. In 1259 Martino della Torre was elected Capitano del Popolo by members of the guilds; he took the city by force, expelled his enemies, and ruled by dictatorial powers, paving streets, digging canals, and taxing the countryside. He also brought the Milanese treasury to collapse; the use of often reckless mercenary units further angered the population, granting an increasing support for the Della Torre's traditional enemies, the Visconti. The most important industries in this period were armaments and wool production, a whole catalogue of activities and trades is given in Bonvesin della Riva's "de Magnalibus Urbis Mediolani".

On 22 July 1262, Ottone Visconti was made archbishop of Milan by Pope Urban IV, against the candidacy of Raimondo della Torre, Bishop of Como. The latter started to publicise allegations that the Visconti had ties to the heretic Cathars and charged them with high treason: the Visconti, who accused the Della Torre of the same crimes, were then banned from Milan and their properties confiscated. The ensuing civil war caused more damage to Milan's population and economy, lasting for more than a decade. Ottone Visconti unsuccessfully led a group of exiles against the city in 1263, but after years of escalating violence on all sides, in the Battle of Desio (1277) he won the city for his family. The Visconti succeeded in ousting the della Torre permanently, and proceeded to rule Milan and its possessions until the 15th century.

Much of the prior history of Milan was the tale of the struggle between two political factions: the Guelphs and the Ghibellines. Most of the time the Guelphs were successful in the city of Milan. Eventually, however, the Visconti family were able to seize power (signoria) in Milan, based on their "Ghibelline" friendship with the Holy Roman Emperors. In 1395, one of these emperors, Wenceslaus IV of Bohemia (1378–1400), raised the Milanese to the dignity of a duchy. Also in 1395, Gian Galeazzo Visconti became duke of Milan. The Ghibelline Visconti family was to retain power in Milan for a century and a half from the early 14th century until the middle of the 15th century.

In 1447 Filippo Maria Visconti, Duke of Milan, died without a male heir; following the end of the Visconti line, the Ambrosian Republic was enacted. The Ambrosian Republic took its name from St. Ambrose, popular patron saint of the city of Milan. Both the Guelph and the Ghibelline factions worked together to bring about the Ambrosian Republic in Milan. Nonetheless, the Republic collapsed when, in 1450, Milan was conquered by Francesco Sforza, of the House of Sforza, which made Milan one of the leading cities of the Italian Renaissance.

Early modern

The Italian Wars – from 1494 to 1559

The Italian Wars were a series of conflicts from 1494 to 1559 that involved, at various times, most of the city-states of Italy, the Papal States, the Republic of Venice, and later most of the major states of Western Europe. Milan's last independent ruler, Lodovico il Moro, called French king Charles VIII into Italy in the expectation that France might be an ally in inter-Italian wars. The future king of France, Louis of Orléans, took part in the expedition and realised Italy was virtually defenceless. This prompted him to come back a few years later in 1500, and claim the Duchy of Milan for himself, his grandmother having been a member of the ruling Visconti family. At that time, Milan was also defended by Swiss mercenaries. After the victory of Louis's successor François I over the Swiss at the Battle of Marignan, the duchy was promised to the French king François I. When the Spanish Habsburg Emperor Charles V defeated François I at the Battle of Pavia in 1525, northern Italy, including Milan, passed to Habsburg Spain.

In 1556, Charles V abdicated in favour of his son Philip II and his brother Ferdinand I. Charles's Italian possessions, including Milan, passed to Philip II and remained with the Spanish line of Habsburgs, while Ferdinand's Austrian line of Habsburgs ruled the Holy Roman Empire.

Great Plague of Milan

The Great Plague of Milan in 1629–31 killed an estimated 60,000 people out of a population of 130,000. This episode is considered one of the last outbreaks of the centuries-long pandemic of plague that began with the Black Death.

War of the Spanish Succession

In 1700 the Spanish line of Habsburgs was extinguished with the death of Charles II. After his death, the War of the Spanish Succession began in 1701 with the occupation of all Spanish possessions by French troops backing the claim of the French Philippe of Anjou to the Spanish throne. In 1706, the French were defeated in Ramillies and Turin and were forced to yield northern Italy to the Austrian Habsburgs. In 1713–1714 the Treaties of Utrecht and Rastatt formally confirmed Austrian sovereignty over most of Spain's Italian possessions including Lombardy and its capital, Milan.

Napoleon
Napoleon invaded Italy in 1796, and Milan was declared capital of the Cisalpine Republic. Later, he declared Milan capital of the Kingdom of Italy and was crowned in the Duomo. Once Napoleon's occupation ended, the Congress of Vienna returned Lombardy, and Milan, along with Veneto, to Austrian control in 1815. During this period, Milan became a centre of lyric opera. Here in the 1770s Mozart had premiered three operas at the Teatro Regio Ducale. Later La Scala became the reference theatre in the world, with its premières of Bellini, Donizetti, Rossini and Verdi. Verdi himself is interred in the Casa di Riposo per Musicisti, his present to Milan. In the 19th century other important theatres were La Cannobiana and the Teatro Carcano.

Wars of the 19th century
On 18 March 1848, the Milanese rebelled against Austrian rule, during the so-called "Five Days", and Field Marshal Radetzky was forced to withdraw from the city temporarily. The Kingdom of Sardinia stepped in to help the insurgents; a plebiscite held in Lombardy decided in favour of unification with Sardinia. However, after defeating the Sardinian forces at Custoza on 24 July, Radetzky was able to reassert Austrian control over Milan and northern Italy. A few years on, however, Italian nationalists again called for the removal of Austria and Italian unification. Sardinia and France formed an alliance and defeated Austria at the Battle of Solferino in 1859. Following this battle, Milan and the rest of Lombardy were incorporated into the Kingdom of Sardinia, which soon gained control of most of Italy and in 1861 was rechristened as the Kingdom of Italy.

Early industrialization

The political unification of Italy cemented Milan's commercial dominance over northern Italy. It also led to a flurry of railway construction that had started under Austrian patronage (Venice–Milan; Milan–Monza) that made Milan the rail hub of northern Italy. Thereafter with the opening of the Gotthard (1881) and Simplon (1906) railway tunnels, Milan became the major South European rail focus for business and passenger movements e.g. the Simplon Orient Express. Rapid industrialization and market expansion put Milan at the centre of Italy's leading industrial region, including extensive stone quarries that have led to much of the air pollution we see today in the region. In the 1890s, Milan was shaken by the Bava-Beccaris massacre, a riot related to a high inflation rate. Meanwhile, as Milanese banks dominated Italy's financial sphere, the city became the country's leading financial centre.

Late modern and contemporary 

In 1919, Benito Mussolini's Blackshirts rallied for the first time in Piazza San Sepolcro and later began their March on Rome in Milan. During the Second World War Milan suffered extensive damage from Allied bombings. When Italy surrendered in 1943, German forces occupied most of Northern Italy until 1945. As a result, resistance groups formed. As the war came to an end, the American 1st Armored Division advanced on Milan – but before they arrived, the resistance seized control of the city and executed Mussolini along with several members of his government. On 29 April 1945, the corpses of Mussolini, his mistress Clara Petacci and other Fascist leaders were hanged in Piazzale Loreto.

During the post-war economic boom, a large wave of internal migration (especially from rural areas of Southern Italy), moved to Milan. The population grew from 1.3 million in 1951 to 1.7 million in 1967. During this period, Milan was largely reconstructed, with the building of several innovative and modernist skyscrapers, such as the Torre Velasca and the Pirelli Tower. The economic prosperity was however overshadowed in the late 1960s and early 1970s during the so-called Years of Lead, when Milan witnessed an unprecedented wave of street violence, labour strikes and political terrorism. The apex of this period of turmoil occurred on 12 December 1969, when a bomb exploded at the National Agrarian Bank in Piazza Fontana, killing seventeen people and injuring eighty-eight.

In the 1980s, with the international success of Milanese houses (like Armani, Versace and Dolce & Gabbana), Milan became one of the world's fashion capitals. The city saw also a marked rise in international tourism, notably from America and Japan, while the stock exchange increased its market capitalisation more than five-fold. This period led the mass media to nickname the metropolis "Milano da bere", literally "Milan to drink". However, in the 1990s, Milan was badly affected by Tangentopoli, a political scandal in which many politicians and businessmen were tried for corruption. The city was also affected by a severe financial crisis and a steady decline in textiles, automobile and steel production.

In the early 21st century, Milan underwent a series of sweeping redevelopments. Its exhibition centre moved to a much larger site in Rho. New business districts such as Porta Nuova and CityLife were constructed. With the decline in manufacturing, the city has sought to develop on its other sources of revenue, including publishing, finance, banking, fashion design, information technology, logistics, transport and tourism. In addition, the city's decades-long population decline seems to have come to an end in recent years, with signs of recovery as it grew by seven percent since the last census.

See also
 Timeline of Milan

References

Bibliography

 
Milan